The Journal of Psychosocial Nursing and Mental Health Services is a monthly peer-reviewed nursing journal for psychosocial and mental health nurses. It includes sections on psychopharmacology, mental health care of older adults, addictive behaviors and diagnoses, and child/adolescent disorders and issues. The editor-in-chief is Mona Shattell (Rush University). The journal was established in 1963 and published bimonthly. In 1978, the publication frequency increased to monthly.

Abstracting and indexing
The journal is abstracted and indexed in:

According to the Journal Citation Reports, the journal has a 2017 impact factor of 0.608.

See also

List of nursing journals

References

External links

Psychiatric and mental health nursing journals
Monthly journals
English-language journals
Publications established in 1963